Thlocklo Tustenuggee (also known as Thlocko, Thlocco, and Tiger Tail) was one of the most prominent Seminole leaders in the Second Seminole War. He spoke English fluently, and also spoke Muscogee. Tustenuggee was one of the three leaders of the 300 Seminoles who fought in the battle that became known as the Dade Massacre. During the war, he and Halleck Tustenuggee, another prominent Seminole leader in the war, met with General Walker Keith Armistead to negotiate, but negotiations broke down and the war resumed. As the war waned, Armistead used money to bribe several Seminole leaders to surrender, but Tustenuggee refused to be bribed and he continued to lead his band in fighting. When the war ended, his Seminole band was one of the few that remained in Florida. In 1843, Tustenuggee and 26 of his followers were forcibly migrated from Florida to New Orleans, Louisiana. They were transported by the USS Lawrence along with 65 other negro Native Americans and three mixed slaves. Tustenuggee then committed suicide by swallowing powdered glass. His death was reported in newspapers, as were the deaths of other prominent Native American leaders who died in connection with the Trail of Tears.

References

19th-century Seminole people
Native Americans of the Seminole Wars
Native American leaders
People from Tallahassee, Florida
Trail of Tears
Suicides in Louisiana
Military personnel who committed suicide
1840s suicides
Year of birth unknown
Suicides by sharp instrument in the United States